Lade  may refer to:

People
 Brendon Lade (born 1976), an Australian rules footballer
 Sir John Lade (1759–1838), a baronet and Regency horse-breeder
 Heinrich Eduard von Lade (1817–1904), a German banker and amateur astronomer
 The Jarls of Lade, Norwegian Jarls based in Lade, Trondheim

Places
 Lade, an island near the ancient Greek city of Miletus. Battle of Lade was a famous naval battle which was fought near the island.
 Lade, Kent, a coastal place in Kent, England
 Lade, Trondheim, an area in the city of Trondheim, Norway
 Lade parish, a civil parish in Valmiera District, Latvia

Other
 LADE - Líneas Aéreas Del Estado, Argentinian airline
 Battle of Lade (494 BC), fought between the Ionians and the Persians
 Battle of Lade (201 BC)
 Lade (crater), a lunar crater named after Heinrich Eduard von Lade
 Mill lade, a Scottish term for a mill race